The Winthrop-Sears Medal is awarded annually by The Chemists' Club of New York in conjunction with the Science History Institute (formerly the Chemical Heritage Foundation) to recognize entrepreneurial achievement in the chemical industry for the betterment of humanity.

Some of the past Winthrop-Sears medal winners include: William Wulfsohn (Ashland Global Holdings), Mario Nappa (Chemours), Peter McCausland (Airgas), Sol Barer (Celgene), Robert Gore (Gore-Tex), and Jon M. Huntsman (Huntsman Chemical Corporation).

History
The Chemists’ Club was founded in 1898 and is the world’s longest serving International organization devoted to the furtherance of chemistry and related technologies. In the US, there were seven chemical societies, known as the Seven Sisters and The Chemists’ Club was alma mater to all of them: American sections of the Society of Chemical Industry, Verein Deutscher Chemiker and Société de Chimie Industrielle, and the American Chemical Society, the American Institute of Chemists, American Institute of Chemical Engineers, and Electrochemical Society; many of the Sisters were born at the Club and all were nurtured there as their memberships entirely overlapped with our Club.

The modern practice of honoring great accomplishments in chemistry originated simultaneously in Berlin and New York in 1903 when the Association of German Chemists and the German Chemical Society instituted both the Liebig Medal and the August Wilhelm von Hofmann Medal while The Chemists’ Club instituted the Nichols Medal and, in 1906, the Perkin Medal. Traditionally The Chemists’ Club facilitated and hosted these celebrations while one of The Sisters awarded the medals.

This arrangement continued for over a half century when, in 1970, The Club initiated The Winthrop-Sears Medal. This medal was named after two very early chemical industry pioneers, one of whom was John Winthrop the Younger, one of America’s earliest scientists who was elected Fellow of the Royal Society in 1662. He is also considered the Father of Connecticut because he convinced the British government to unite Saybrook, New Haven and River Colonies into a combined Connecticut Colony and then became popular Colonial Governor for many years.

Selection process

The Winthrop-Sears Medal for Entrepreneurial Achievement recognized entrepreneurship that revitalized the chemical industry and betters humanity. The medal is presented each December at The Chemists’ Club annual Egg Nog Gala held at the New York Academy of Sciences (previously presented in association with the Chemical Heritage Foundation during the Chemical Heritage Foundation’s Heritage Day activities, in the spring of each year). The medal was established in 1970 to recognize individuals who, by their entrepreneurial achievement, have contributed to the vitality of the chemical industry and the betterment of humanity. The medal is named in honor of two of America’s earliest chemical entrepreneurs, John Winthrop, Jr., son of the first Governor of the Massachusetts Bay Colony and considered the first chemist in America, and John Sears, creator of the Massachusetts salt industry.

The recipient of the Winthrop-Sears medal is chosen through the Chemists’ Club’s designated nominating committee. The nominating committee consists of the President of the Chemists’ Club, one Past President of The Chemists’ Club, and two other members of The Chemists’ Club Board of Trustees, at minimum. The President selects the chair of the committee and may also name other participants to the committee who need not be members of The Chemists’ Club as well (the committee has previously included representatives from Societe de Chimie (America’s Section), SOCMA, and other industry affiliates/partners).

The nominating committee members each submit names of candidates whom they consider worthy of the Winthrop-Sears medal and the nominating committee members then come to a consensus on a prospective awardee. The prospective awardees are evaluated based on the impact of their contribution to the vitality of the chemical industry and the betterment of humanity over the past year, and their journey to their entrepreneurial achievement. Prospective awardees are not limited to c-suite professionals or chemistry-specific employees.

Once an awardee is nominated, the chair of the committee then notifies the prospective awardee of his/her nomination and the requirements for receiving the medal. If the prospective awardee accepts the nomination, the medal is presented to the nominee at the Chemists’ Club’s annual Egg Nog Gala where they deliver a brief address and accept the award. If the nominee rejects the award, the nominating committee then nominates their second choice nominee for the award and repeats the nominee notification process.

The remainder of the top three candidates selected by the nominating committee for the Winthrop-Sears medal that had not received the medal in the current year remain candidates for the medal for the following two years.

Recipients
Source (2004–10):

 
Undated: Emerson Kampen, Great Lakes Chemical (before 1995); Robert J. Milano of Millmaster (before 1976)
1970 ?
1971 Leonard Pool, Air Products
1972 Daniel James Terra, Lawter International Incorporated
1973–1975 ?
1976 Robert I. Wishnick, Witco Chemical
1977 Ralph Landau, Halcon International
1978 ?
1979 Robert H. Krieble, Loctite
1980 Alfred Bader, Sigma-Aldrich Corporation
1981 ?
1982 John T. Files, Merichem
1983 ?
1984 George Gregory
1985 Charles R. and Lucia Shipley, Shipley Company (Rohm and Haas Electronic)
1986 Paul M. Cook, Raychem
1987 ?
1988 Gordon A. Cain, Sterling Chemicals
1989 ?
1990 Arthur Mendolia and Cyril Baldwin, Cambrex
1991–1993 ?
1994 Jon M. Huntsman, Huntsman Chemical Corp
1995 Harold A. Sorgenti, ARCO
1996 John W. Johnstone, Jr., Olin
1996–2001 ?
2002 James Mack, Cambrex
2003 Robert W. Gore, W. L. Gore & Associates (Gore-Tex)
2004 George Rosenkranz and Alejandro Zaffaroni, Syntex
2005 Herbert W. Boyer, Genentech
2006 Sol J. Barer, Celgene
2007 Phillip Allen Sharp, Biogen
2008 Haldor Topsøe, Haldor Topsøe
2009 Zsolt Rumy, Zoltek
2010 Peter McCausland, Airgas
2011 ?
2012 ?
2013 Joel S. Marcus, Alexandria Real Estate Equities
2014 Scott Power, Dupont
2015 Mario Nappa, Chemours
2016 John Panicella, Solenis
2017 Heinz Holler, The Dow Chemical Company
2018 George Corbin, Solvay
2019 William Wulfson, Ashland Global Holdings
2020 Linda Rendle, The Clorox Company

See also
List of business and industry awards
List of chemistry awards
List of prizes named after people

References

Chemistry awards
American science and technology awards
Awards established in 1970
1970 establishments in New York City